Tonwelle is the second album by Klaus Schulze released under the name of Richard Wahnfried. It was originally released in 1981, and was not reissued by Revisited Records as part of the overall reissue program of Schulze albums. A two-disc reissue was released in January 2012 by MIG Music, featuring different speeds from the original recording.

Track listing
All tracks composed by Klaus Schulze.

Personnel
 Klaus Schulze – synths
 Manuel Göttsching – guitar
 Karl Wahnfried – guitar
 Michael Shrieve – drums
 Michael Garvens – vocals

References

External links
 Tonwelle at the official site of Klaus Schulze
 

Klaus Schulze albums
Ambient albums by German artists
Trance albums
1981 albums